People´s Republic of China at the Summer Universiade participated in the 1959 Summer Universiade, and has re-participated from the 1977 Summer Universiade. China won 1008 medals in 21 appearances at the Summer Universiade and are at the 2nd rank in the all-time Summer Universiade medal table.

Medals

Summer Games

Winter Games

See also
China at the Olympics
China at the Paralympics
China at the Asian Games

References

External links
 FISU History at the FISU